There are two species of lizard named southern rock agama:

 Agama atra
 Agama knobeli